Bathygadus is a genus of rattails of the family Bathygadidae.

Species
There are currently 13 recognized species in this genus:
 Bathygadus antrodes (Jordan & Starks, 1904)
 Bathygadus bowersi (Gilbert, 1905)
 Bathygadus cottoides Günther, 1878 (Codheaded rattail)
 Bathygadus dubiosus Weber, 1913
 Bathygadus entomelas Gilbert & Hubbs, 1920
 Bathygadus favosus  Goode & Bean, 1886
 Bathygadus furvescens Alcock, 1894 (Blackfin rattail)
 Bathygadus garretti Gilbert & Hubbs, 1916
 Bathygadus macrops Goode & Bean, 1885 (Bullseye grenadier)
 Bathygadus melanobranchus Vaillant, 1888 (Vaillant's grenadier)
 Bathygadus nipponicus (Jordan & Gilbert, 1904)
 Bathygadus spongiceps Gilbert & Hubbs, 1920 (Spongy rattail)
 Bathygadus sulcatus (H. M. Smith & Radcliffe, 1912)

References 

Marine fish genera
Gadiformes
Extant Eocene first appearances
Taxa named by Albert Günther